Craugastor lineatus, also known as the Montane robber frog, is a species of frog in the family Craugastoridae. It is native to Guatemala and southern Mexico (Oaxaca and Chiapas). It lives in lower montane evergreen forests.

References

lineatus
Amphibians of Guatemala
Amphibians of Mexico
Amphibians described in 1879
Taxa named by Paul Brocchi